The Church of Saint Ursula of the Blacks (Italian: Chiesa di Sant'Orsola dei Negri) is a Baroque-style, Roman Catholic church located in the central Via Maqueda #110, adjacent to the Palazzo Comitini, in the quarter of the Albergaria, within the historic centre of Palermo, Region of Sicily, Italy.

History 
The church was built for the "Compagnia di Sant'Orsola" (Brotherhood of Saint Ursula), a lay confraternity founded in 1564 in the neighboring church of Santi Quaranta Martiri Pisani al Casalotto. The tag dei Negri refers to the black gowns worn by the members of the Confraternity during processions.

The church was open to the public in 1662. The nave, and maybe the entire building, was designed by Giacomo Amato. In 1672, the church was refurbished with a rich decoration of stucco and painting. The nave ceiling was frescoed with a depiction of the Glory of St Ursula by Gaspare Serenari. The 
In the following century another refurbishment was made. The stucco decorations of Giacomo Serpotta for some of the chapels include multiple macabre skeletal representations.

Art 

Oil on canvas:
 Saint Anne and child Mary, school of Pietro Novelli
 Martyrdom of Saint Ursula, Pietro Novelli
 Madonna with Salvator Mundi, Pietro Novelli
 Jesus Christ with the Cross, Pietro Novelli
 The Pool of Bethesda, flanking apse canvas by Antonio Manno
 Descent of Christ into Limbo, flanking apse canvas by Antonio Manno
 Deposition with the Three Marys, main altarpiece by Giuseppe Patania
 Saint Jerome, Zoppo di Gangi
 Salvation of the Souls of Purgatory, unknown author
 Holy Family, unknown author

Frescoes:
 Assumption of the Virgin, Gaspare Serenari
 Glory of Saint Ursula, Gaspare Serenari
 Faith and Charity, Gaspare Serenari

The pillars are decorated with ovals representing the patron saints of Palermo: Lucy, Christina, Agatha, Ninfa, Olivia and Rosalia by the workshop of Pietro Novelli.

References

External links 
  Image gallery
  History of the church - Provincia Regionale di Palermo

Orsola
Baroque architecture in Palermo
Orsola